Route 4 (Chinese: 四號幹綫) is an east-west road artery along the Hong Kong Island, Hong Kong. Formerly divided into routes 7 (Causeway Bay - Aberdeen) and 8 (Utilisation of Island Eastern Corridor), it was absorbed into Route 4 in 2004.

Route
The current Route 4 could be divided into two sections:

From Chai Wan the route travels west towards Central via Island Eastern Corridor, Central–Wan Chai Bypass. Part two of the roadway extension, which took Route 4 from Connaught Road Central to Kennedy Town via  was completed in 1997.

The areas covered by the route include Kennedy Town, Shek Tong Tsui, Sai Ying Pun, Sheung Wan, Central, Wan Chai, Causeway Bay, Quarry Bay, Taikoo Shing, Shau Kei Wan, A Kung Ngam, Heng Fa Chuen and Chai Wan.

The section of Route 4 from Kennedy Town to Aberdeen was included in the proposal when construction commenced, but this section has yet to be built.

Exits and Interchanges

References

Route map from Transport Department
Hong Kong Guide 2004, HKSAR Government

External links

 
Routes in Hong Kong
Hong Kong Island